Supercross is a 2005 American action film directed by Steve Boyum and starring Steve Howey and Mike Vogel. The film portrays youthful relationships in the world of professional Supercross.

Plot synopsis

K.C. Carlyle (Howey) and Trip (Vogel) are brothers who compete in a supercross, a race involving off-the-road motorcycles on an artificial dirt track.  K.C. accepts a lucrative deal to race on a factory team and leaves behind his brother to fund his own racing.  When an accident disables Trip, K.C. resolves his differences with him, and Trip helps coach K.C. to win the supercross championship.

Cast
 Steve Howey as K.C. Carlyle
 Mike Vogel as Trip Carlyle
 Cameron Richardson as Piper Cole
 Sophia Bush as Zoe Lang
 Channing Tatum as Rowdy Sparks
 Robert Carradine as Clay Sparks
 Robert Patrick as Earl Cole
 Aaron Carter as Owen Cole
 J. D. Pardo as Chuy
  Antonia Jones as Nurse
 Jamie Little as herself
 Ricky Carmichael as himself
 Kevin Windham as himself

Production
In December 2002, Supercross was announced as one of the first productions of Tag Studios, a jointly owned film and TV production entity owned by music producer Lou Pearlman and Steven Austin a producer of family films.

Reception
Supercross was panned by critics. The film holds a rating of 5% on Rotten Tomatoes based on 73 reviews with the consensus: "While it showcases some cool stunts, Supercross feels like an infomercial for its titular sport, with undeveloped characters and a shopworn plot."

Soundtrack

Supercross is the soundtrack to the motocross film "Supercross". It has not been released yet but here are the tracks listed in the film.

Track listing
 Saturday Night         - 4:01 - (Ozomatli)
 Pirates                    - 2:20 - (Bullets and Octane)
 California Records   -         - (Longbeach Shortcuts)
 Make Them Believe - 3:47 - (Fu Manchu)
 That's the Way It Is         - 3:12 - (Powerman 5000)
 Tear Up This Town - 3:27 - (Leif Garrett)
 Chemical                - 3:48 - (Joseph Arthur) (aka Start Trouble)
 Get Out Alive         - 3:27 - (Socialburn)
 Days of My Life    - 4:00 - (City of London)
 Ride of Your Life   - 3:00 - (John Gregory)
 Things I've Done    - 5:00 - (Natural)
 Everytime              - 4:00 - (Rusty Truck)
 Every Second        - 3:00 - (Change of Pace)

References

External links
 
 
 

2005 films
American action films
American auto racing films
Motorcycle racing films
Films directed by Steve Boyum
20th Century Fox films
2000s English-language films
2000s American films